A bawab or bewab (   , literally "gatekeeper") is a kind of doorman common in Cairo, Egypt. A bawab's job is to watch the entrance of the house or building where they work and perform errands and tasks for residents, essentially combining the function of a doorman with that of a building superintendent and errand boy. The bawab has been described by the BBC as a security guard, porter, enforcer of social mores and general snoop, all rolled into one. 

Most buildings have four to six bawabs who work in shifts. Bawabs are usually male and wear a gallabeya (a type of kaftan), a native Egyptian dress. Traditionally, bawabs have been Nubians, an ethnic group from southern Egypt and northern Sudan. Often they come from rural areas. Many modern bawabs are local ex-military men, and some buildings have transitioned to using private security companies which provide uniformed guards.

A bawab's salary is determined and paid by residents of the house or the residential building. Many bawabs augment their salary by taking tips from residents and prospective tenants. A bawab might accept a tip from residents seeking privacy for a romantic rendezvous, or from couples looking to rent a unit. Bawabs have been criticized for this system of taking tips or bribes to avoid the bawab gossiping to other residents about them. Women in particular have been subject to the threat of reputational damage, with one female visitor to a BBC reporter saying "I can't come up to your apartment with him there...he'll think I'm a whore!" 

Bawab characters are common in media featuring Cairo. For example, Egyptian actor Ahmed Zaki portrayed a bawab in the 1990 film El-Beh El-Bawab.

References

Cleaning and maintenance occupations
Protective service occupations
Culture in Cairo